Leontari may refer to places in Greece:
                                    
Leontari, Arcadia
Leontari, Boeotia
Leontari, Karditsa